Beit Yashout is a town in northwestern Syria, administratively part of the Jableh District of the Latakia Governorate, and located south of Latakia. Nearby localities include Ayn al-Sharqiyah to the west and Daliyah to the south. According to the Syria Central Bureau of Statistics, Beit Yashout had a population of 6,115 in the 2004 census. The town is located in the An-Nusayriyah Mountains at an elevation of around 500 m (1,700 ft).

Beit Yashout is one of the villages inhabited by the Alawite Hadadeen clan, to which former first lady Aniseh Makhluf belonged. However, the village was a traditional home of the Bani Ali clan, also Alawite. Beit Yashout is the hometown of Muhammad al-Khuli, a prominent military official in Baathist governments in the 1960s and throughout former president Hafez al-Assad's time in office (1970–2000).

References

Bibliography

Populated places in Jableh District
Towns in Syria
Alawite communities in Syria